Maring and Uipo (Khoibu) are closely related Sino-Tibetan languages spoken by the Maring Naga and Khoibu (Uipo) Naga of India. Linguistically, they are closest to the Tangkhulic languages.

Maring is spoken in Laiching in the southeast of Chandel District, Manipur and the northern border mountainous region of Tengnoupal subdivision of that district (Ethnologue). Khoibu is spoken in Khoibu, Narum, Saibol, and Yangkhul villages of Chandel District (Ethnologue).

In 2020 Uipo language activist Mr. Mosyel Syelsaangthyel Khaling became the first Indian citizen to receive the Excellence in Community Linguistics Award of the Linguistic Society of America.

References 

Languages of Manipur
Tangkhulic languages